Heinrich Setz (12 March 1915 – 13 March 1943) was a German Luftwaffe military aviator during World War II, a fighter ace credited with 138 enemy aircraft shot down in 274 combat missions. The majority of his victories were claimed over the Eastern Front, with six claims over the Western Front.

Born in Gundelsdorf, Setz volunteered for military service in the Luftwaffe of Nazi Germany in 1936. Following flight training and a period at a fighter pilot training school as an instructor, he was posted to Jagdgeschwader 77 (JG 77—77th Fighter Wing) in 1940. Following the Norwegian Campaign he claimed his first three aerial victories in late 1940 in that theater.  In July 1941, Setz was appointed Staffelkapitän (squadron leader) of the 4. Staffel (4th squadron) of JG 77 which he led in Operation Barbarossa, the German invasion of the Soviet Union. Following his 43rd aerial victory he was awarded the Knight's Cross of the Iron Cross on 31 December 1941 and the Knight's Cross of the Iron Cross with Oak Leaves on 23 June 1942 after 81 victories. He claimed his 100th aerial victory on 24 July 1942.

In February 1943 Setz was appointed Gruppenkommandeur (group commander) of the I. Gruppe (1st group) of Jagdgeschwader 27 (JG 27—27th Fighter Wing) which was based in France on the Western Front. Setz claimed three more victories before he was killed in action on his 274th combat mission in a mid-air collision with a Supermarine Spitfire on 13 March 1943.

Early life and career
Setz was born on 12 March 1915 in Gundelsdorf near Kronach, Upper Franconia in the Kingdom of Bavaria. He was the son of an Oberförster (head of a forest range) and joined the military service of the Luftwaffe as a Fahnenjunker (cadet) on 6 April 1936. He was promoted to Leutnant (second lieutenant) on 1 January 1938. On 1 July 1938, he was posted to Jagdgeschwader 135 (135th Fighter Wing). From April 1939 onwards he was posted to a Jagdfliegerschule (fighter pilot training school) as an instructor. On 3 April 1940 he was transferred to Jagdfliegerschule 3 at Stolp-Reitz, present day Słupsk-Redzikowo Airport in Poland. There he was promoted to Oberleutnant (first lieutenant) on 1 June 1940.

World War II
World War II in Europe began on Friday 1 September 1939 when German forces invaded Poland. Setz was transferred to a front-line unit when he joined II. Gruppe (2nd group) of Jagdgeschwader 77 (JG 77—77th Fighter Wing) on 28 June 1940. There he was assigned to the 6. Staffel (6th squadron) of JG 77 on 1 July 1940. JG 77 at the time was based at Kristiansand, in southern Norway. He claimed three aerial victories in this theater, his first aerial victory, a Royal Air Force (RAF) No. 82 Squadron Bristol Blenheim bomber, was shot down south of Stavanger over Norway's west coast on 27 August 1940. This achievement earned him the Iron Cross 2nd Class on 12 September 1940. Following two further victories over Norway, he received Iron Cross 1st Class on 18 October 1940. In May 1941, Setz was appointed Staffelkapitän (squadron leader) of 4. Staffel of 2. (Schul.)/Ergänzungs-Gruppe of JG 77, a supplementary training group for new pilots posted to the front.

Eastern Front
Following the Invasion of Yugoslavia, JG 77 was moved to Romania in preparation for Operation Barbarossa, the German invasion of the Soviet Union on 22 June 1941. II. and III. Gruppe, plus the Stab (headquarters unit), of JG 77 supported the German advance as part of Heeresgruppe Süd (Army Group South). On 21 June, II. Gruppe was ordered from Bucharest to Roman, a forward airfield near the Siret river.  That evening, the pilots and ground crews were briefed of the upcoming invasion of the Soviet Union, which opened the Eastern Front.
In late June or early July, Setz succeeded Hauptmann Walter Jänisch as Staffelkapitän of 4. Staffel of JG 77. There, he claimed his first aerial victory on the Eastern Front, his fourth in total, on a Junkers Ju 87 dive bomber escort mission to Kamianets-Podilskyi. He shot down a Polikarpov I-16 fighter aircraft. On 21 July, II. Gruppe flew thirteen combat missions providing fighter protection for the bridges over the Dniester near Yampol. That day, Setz claimed two I-16 fighters shot down. On the twelfth mission, which started at 18:18 from Bălți, Setz himself was shot down in his Messerschmitt Bf 109 E (Werknummer 1384—factory number), resulting in a forced landing.  At the time, the architect of the Holocaust Reinhard Heydrich, who was holding the rank of Major der Reserve (major of the military reserves) within the Luftwaffe, served together with Setz in II. Gruppe of JG 77.

Setz claimed his 30th victory on 29 October 1941 and less than a month later, on 21 November, he shot down his 40th opponent. On 27 November 1941, Setz claimed three aerial victories in combat south of Rostov-on-Don. A Polikarpov I-153 biplane fighter and two Tupolev SB-2 bombers took his total to 45, his last victories in 1941.  II. Gruppe was withdrawn from combat operations on 3 December 1941 and moved to Vienna-Aspern for reequipment with the Bf 109 F-4. Setz was awarded the Knight's Cross of the Iron Cross on 31 December 1941. By end 1941, 4. Staffel had been credited with 110 aerial victories and further 89 aircraft destroyed on the ground under his leadership.

Crimea and Caucasus
On 11 March 1942, II. Gruppe began relocating back to the Eastern Front, at first to Proskuriv where it stayed for a few days, and then to Sarabuz on the Crimea, arriving on 17 March 1942. Here he became an "ace-in-a-day" on 19 March 1942, claiming his 46th to 50th aerial victory during the Siege of Sevastopol. That day, he was credited with shooting down two Petlyakov Pe-2 ground attack aircraft, two Mikoyan-Gurevich MiG-3 fighter aircraft and one Ilyushin DB-3 bomber. Setz claimed three Yakovlev Yak-7 fighters on 21 April over Prymorskyi against the Crimean Front taking his total to 60 aerial victories. He was again shot down on 3 May, resulting in forced landing of his Bf 109 F-4. He was shot down by pilots from the 9 IAP (Fighter Aviation Regiment—Istrebitelny Aviatsionny Polk) of the ChF (Soviet Black Sea Fleet—Chernomorskiy Flot).

On 13 May 1942, he claimed three further victories, two Yakovlev Yak-1 fighters and one Lavochkin-Gorbunov-Gudkov LaGG-3 fighters, taking his total to 70 victories. Following his 81st victory on 23 June, a I-153 fighter, Setz was awarded the Knight's Cross of the Iron Cross with Oak Leaves on the same day. The award was presented at the Führerhauptquartier (Führer Headquarters) at Rastenburg on 28/29 June 1942. Two other Luftwaffe officers were presented with the Oak Leaves that day by Hitler, the night-fighter pilot Hauptmann (captain) Helmut Lent and fellow JG 77 pilot Oberleutnant Friedrich Geißhardt.

Following his return to the front, JG 77 was assigned to the newly created Army Group B in support of Fall Blau (Case Blue), the Wehrmacht'''s 1942 strategic summer offensive in southern Russia. Setz briefly commanded II./JG 77 in July for Gruppenkommandeur (group commander) Anton Mader. He claimed two MiG-3s on 23 July 1942. On the next day, 24 July, he reached his 100th aerial victory. He was the 13th Luftwaffe pilot to achieve the century mark. This achievement earned him German Cross in Gold which was awarded to him on 21 August 1942. On 16 September, Setz, for the second time, became an "ace-in-a-day" after he claimed the destruction of three LaGG-3 fighter aircraft and two Ilyushin Il-2 ground-attack aircraft, taking his total to 133 aerial victories. Setz's 4. Staffel was then reequipped with the Bf 109 G-2 and transferred to an airfield at Stary Oskol on 23 September 1942. On 2 October, 4. And 6. Staffel flew a fighter escort mission for a flight of Heinkel He 111 bombers attacking Soviet positions north of Voronezh. On this mission, Setz claimed two LaGG-3, his last victories on the Eastern Front. This took his total to 135 aerial victories. Setz was promoted to Hauptmann on 1 November 1942. On 7 November 1942, II. Gruppe received orders from Generalmajor Alfred Bülowius, the commander of the 1. Flieger-Division (1st Air Division), to relocate to the North African theater of operations.

Western Front and death
Setz however did not rejoin his unit. On 12 November he was appointed the new Gruppenkommandeur of I. Gruppe (1st group) of Jagdgeschwader 27 (JG 27—27th Fighter Wing), to replace Hauptmann Gerhard Homuth who had to resign the command because of illness. This unit had formerly led the assault in North Africa but after being shattered in the recent battles around El Alamein had been pulled back for rest and rebuild. Setz took over his command in Bari, Italy on 20 November 1942, and led the transferal back to Krefeld in Germany, where they arrived on 28 November 1942.

After a brief period of recreation, the group began preparations for a transfer to France on 2 January 1943. Stab, 1. and 3. Staffeln transferred to Évreux Air Field on 31 January 1943. The remaining groups followed and new pilots and new Bf 109 G-4 joined the group. Now fighting a completely different type of air-war, versus the combat box-formations of bombers of the United States Army Air Forces (USAAF) VIII Bomber Command, Setz had the entire group conduct training flights and reported operational readiness on 20 February 1943.

On 13 March 1943, I. Gruppe took off to intercept USAAF Boeing B-17 Flying Fortress bombers. On this 274th combat mission, he claimed two escorting Supermarine Spitfires from the Royal Canadian Air Force (RCAF) No. 127 Wing in five minutes over Abbeville, but it is believed he was killed when he collided with a third fifteen minutes later at high altitude. In recognition of his leadership, he was posthumously promoted to Major, backdated to 1 March 1943. Setz, who was the brother in law of Franz Ruhl, was interred at the Bourdon German war cemetery in Bourdon, France in block 32, row 11, grave 427. Following his death, Hauptmann Hans-Joachim Heinecke briefly led the Gruppe until Hauptmann Erich Hohagen took command on 7 April.

Summary of career

Aerial victory claims
According to US historian David T. Zabecki, Setz was credited with 138 aerial victories. Obermaier and Spick also list Setz with 138 enemy aircraft shot down in 274 combat missions, of which 132 were claimed over the Eastern Front, with 3 during the invasion of Norway and 3 over the Western Front in defense of the Reich. Mathews and Foreman, authors of Luftwaffe Aces — Biographies and Victory Claims, researched the German Federal Archives and found records for 133 aerial victory claims, plus three further unconfirmed claims. This figure of confirmed claims includes 128 aerial victories on the Eastern Front and five on the Western Front.

Victory claims were logged to a map-reference (PQ = Planquadrat), for example "PQ 3541". These sectors were then subdivided into 36 smaller units to give a location area 3 × 4 km in size.

Awards
 Iron Cross (1939)
 2nd Class (12 September 1940)
 1st Class (18 October 1940)
 German Cross in Gold on 21 August 1942 as Oberleutnant in the II./Jagdgeschwader 77
 Knight's Cross of the Iron Cross with Oak Leaves
 Knight's Cross on 31 December 1941 as Oberleutnant and Staffelkapitän of the 4./Jagdgeschwader 77
 102nd Oak Leaves on 23 June 1942 as Oberleutnant and Staffelkapitän of the 4./Jagdgeschwader'' 77

Dates of rank

Notes

References

Citations

Bibliography

 
 
 
 
 
 
 
 
 
 
 
 
 
 
 
 
 
 
 
 
 
 
 
 
 

1915 births
1943 deaths
Luftwaffe pilots
German World War II flying aces
Luftwaffe personnel killed in World War II
Recipients of the Gold German Cross
Recipients of the Knight's Cross of the Iron Cross with Oak Leaves
Burials at Bourdon German war cemetery
People from Kronach (district)
Military personnel from Bavaria